Hideshi (written: 秀士, 秀司 or 日出志) is a masculine Japanese given name. Notable people with the name include:

, Japanese businessman
, Japanese archaeologist
, Japanese manga artist
, Japanese racing driver

Japanese masculine given names